Murchisonella evermanni is a species of sea snail, a marine gastropod mollusk in the family Murchisonellidae, the pyrams and their allies.

Distribution
 Marine

References

 Peñas, A.; Rolán, E. (2013). Revision of the genera Murchisonella and Pseudoaclisina (Gastropoda, Heterobranchia, Murchisonellidae). Vita Malacologica. 11: 15-64

Murchisonellidae
Gastropods described in 1928